George Kinnell (22 December 1937 – 16 October 2021) was a Scottish footballer who played in the Football League for Middlesbrough, Oldham Athletic, Sunderland and Stoke City.

Career
Born in Cowdenbeath, Kinnell started his career in Scotland firstly playing for junior club Crossgates Primrose before joining Aberdeen in 1959 for £200. After serving four years with the "Dons" Kinnell earned a move to English Football League side Stoke City in 1963 for a fee of £35,000.

Although he was a midfielder by trade manager Tony Waddington played him in forward position during the 1965–66 season due his physical strength. He never managed to adapt to his new role and quickly returned to the midfield. He later joined Oldham Athletic, Sunderland, and Middlesbrough and he finished his career in Australia, firstly in Melbourne with Juventus where he helped the club win the Victorian State League and Dockerty Cup in 1970 and then in Perth, with Kingsway Olympic and Kiev.

Personal life
Kinnell was the brother of footballer Andy Kinnell and the cousin of Scotland international Jim Baxter.

He died on 16 October 2021, at the age of 83.

Career statistics

References

External links
 

1937 births
2021 deaths
People from Cowdenbeath
Scottish footballers
Association football midfielders
Stoke City F.C. players
Middlesbrough F.C. players
Aberdeen F.C. players
Oldham Athletic A.F.C. players
Sunderland A.F.C. players
English Football League players
Scottish Football League players
Crossgates Primrose F.C. players
Vancouver Royals players
United Soccer Association players
Scottish expatriate footballers
Scottish expatriate sportspeople in Canada
Expatriate soccer players in Canada